Montu Saini (born 5 August 1982) is an Indian chef based in New Delhi. He was posted as Executive chef to the President of India in the Rashtrapati Bhavan from June, 2015 to July, 2020. He is the recipient of "Young Hotel Chef" Award 2014 from Federation of Hotel & Restaurant Association Of India and "Master Chef" Award 2014 from Indian Culinary Forum

Montu Saini was associated with Ashok Group of Hotel since 2005. He joined Ashok Group of Hotels as a Kitchen Management Trainee and became a Chef in 2007 promoting to Sous Chef in March 2014. Notably he is also the youngest member of the Club des Chefs des Chefs.

As a Presidents Secretariat headed the kitchen Brigade of family and state banquets. He has hosted banquets to some of the highest dignitaries of the world from countries like Tanzania, Republic of Mozambique, French Republic, Abu Dhabi, Myanmar, Republic of Egypt, Israel, Republic of Indonesia since his position as the executive chef to the president of India.

Career 
On 16 June 2015, he joined the Presidents Secretariat as Executive Chef to president of India and headed the Kitchen Brigade of family kitchen as well as State Banquets.

He planned and executed menus for state banquets, high teas and luncheons at which the President of India hosts his counterparts and other VIPs from India and abroad. While he specializes in dishing out cuisines from around the globe; his signature dishes include the Subz Baoli Handi, wherein vegetables are slow cooked in the dum style in their own juices, and Murgh Darbari, a chicken curry inspired by nihari, and made with roasted wheat and red chilli powder.

Busiest days of the year are of state banquets and various ceremonies, including the swearing-in, award functions, etc. But the real challenge, he said, are on days such 15 August and 26 January, when the President organizes At Home, which is attended by around 1,500-2,500 people. The third India-Africa Forum Summit where he and his team served 54 Heads of States at One Table in November 2015 was one of the reputed events of his career. This was the biggest State Banquet ever conducted by the Palace. Recently ASEAN Heads of States from 10 neighboring countries were also served at one table.

Media 
Montu Saini, organized the general assembly of one of the world's most elite gatherings of culinary experts: Le Club des Chefs des Chefs (CCC). India hosted the annual assembly of CCC for the first time in 2016. The club was greeted & hosted by The then President of India Shri Pranab Mukherjee in the palace. Honorable Prime Minister Shri Narendra Modi also hosted a Hi-Tea on 25 October 2016, in Rashtrapati Bhavan, New Delhi, India.

He was the jury member of Spice Route culinary festival where chef from 15 nations gathered in Kochi in 2016 organized by Ministry of Tourism.

References 

1982 births
Living people